Honeymoon Ahead is a 1945 American comedy film directed by Reginald Le Borg and written by Val Burton and Elwood Ullman. The film stars Allan Jones, Grace McDonald, Raymond Walburn, Vivian Austin, Jack Overman and Murray Alper. The film was released on May 11, 1945, by Universal Pictures.

Plot

Cast        
Allan Jones as Orpheus
Grace McDonald as Evelyn Mack
Raymond Walburn as Rollie Mack
Vivian Austin as Rosita
Jack Overman as Knuckles
Murray Alper as Spike 
Eddie Acuff as Connors
John Abbott as Welles
William Haade as Trigger
Arthur Loft as Sheriff Weeks
Ralph Peters as George
Charles F. Miller as Ephraim
Sarah Padden as Mrs. Halett
Jack Rube Clifford as Gus

References

External links
 

1945 films
American comedy films
1945 comedy films
Universal Pictures films
Films directed by Reginald Le Borg
Films scored by Frank Skinner
American black-and-white films
1940s English-language films
1940s American films